Frank Ruda is a German philosopher. He is senior lecturer in philosophy at the University of Dundee. He is also a visiting professor at the Institute of Philosophy, Scientific Research Centre in Ljubljana (Slovenia)  and Professor at the European Graduate School /EGS (https://egs.edu/faculty/frank-ruda). 
He received his PhD in 2008 from University of Potsdam under the supervision of Manfred Schneider and Christoph Menke with a work on Hegel's Philosophy of Right and his venia legendi (Habilitation) in 2017 from the Free University Berlin.

Works
 Hegel's Rabble: An Investigation into Hegel's Philosophy of Right. With a preface by Slavoj Žižek. London & New York: Continuum, 2011.
 For Badiou: Idealism without Idealism. With a preface by Slavoj Žižek. Evanston: Northwestern University Press, 2015.
 Abolishing Freedom: A Plea for a Contemporary Use of Fatalism. Lincoln: University of Nebraska Press, 2016.
 The Dash - The Other Side of Absolute Knowing (with Rebecca Comay). Cambridge: MIT Press Ltd, 2018.
 Indifferenz und Wiederholung. Konstanz: Konstanz University Press, 2018.
 Gegen-Freiheit. Komik und Fatalismus. Konstanz: Konstanz University Press, 2018.
 Reading Marx (with Agon Hamza and Slavoj Zizek). London, Polity Press, 2018.

https://www.dundee.ac.uk/philosophy/staff/details/frank-ruda.php

External links
https://www.dundee.ac.uk/philosophy/staff/details/frank-ruda.php#tab-Publications

Living people
Year of birth missing (living people)
German philosophers
French–German translators
21st-century translators